The 9th Naples Grand Prix was a motor race, run to Formula One rules, held on 6 May 1956 at Posillipo Circuit, Naples. The race was run over 60 laps of the circuit, and was won by French driver Robert Manzon in a Gordini Type 16.

Results

Source:

References

Naples Grand Prix
Grand Prix of Naples